Benno may refer to:

People

Mononym
 (927–940), saint
 (1049–1061)
Benno I of Osnabrück (bishop, 1052–1067)
Benno of Meissen (bishop, 1066–1106), saint
Benno II of Osnabrück (bishop, 1068–1088)
Benno of Santi Martino e Silvestro (fl. 1082–1098), cardinal
Benno (bishop of Cesena) (1123–1141)
 (1126–1139)
 (1230–1242)

First name
 (1861–1936), German racecar driver
Benno Adam (1812–1892), German painter
 (1912–1967), German physician
 (1904–1986), Swiss conductor and composer
Benno von Arent (1898–1956), German film director
 (1876–1944), German industrialist
 (1933–2010), German mathematician
Benno Baginsky (1848–1919), German physician
 (died 1936), German entrepreneur and politician
 (1860–1938), German painter
 (died 1942), German footballer
 (1883–1916), German painter
Benno Besson (1922–2006), Swiss actor and director
 (1571–1625), member of the Fruitbearing Society
 (1869–1965), Austrian industrialist
 (1824–1905), German theologian
 (died 1946), Sorbian writer
Benno Chajes (1880–1938), German physician
Benno Cohen (1894–1975), Israeli politician
Benno Credé (1847–1929), German surgeon
 (1857–1917), German entrepreneur
 (1870–1947), German philologist
Benno Dorer (born 1964), German businessman
 (born 1960), Austrian Catholic priest and bishop of Feldkirch
Benno Elkan (1877–1960), German–born British sculptor
Benno Erdmann (1851–1921), German neo–Kantian philosopher
Benno Fiala Ritter von Fernbrugg (1890–1964), Austro–Hungarian fighter ace
 (1902–1981), Czechoslovak politician
Benno Friesen (1929–2021), Canadian professor and politician
Benno Fürmann (born 1972), German film and television actor
Benno Geiger (1882–1965), Austrian art historian
Benno de Goeij (born 1975), Dutch record producer
Benno Griebert (1909–2000), German art historian and art dealer
Benno Groß (born 1957), German gymnast
Benno Gut (1897–1970), Benedictine monk and cardinal
 (1891–1952), Estonian singer
Benno Herrmann (1918–1999), German pilot and recipient of the Knight's Cross of the Iron Cross
 (1919–2005), German dancer and actor
 (died 1941), German writer, photographer and lawyer
Benno Jacob (1862–1945), Jewish rabbi and Bible scholar
Benno Janssen (1874–1964), American architect
Benno Karner (born 1901), Austrian bobsledder
Benno Kerry (1858–1889), Austrian philosopher
Benno Kögl (1892–1973), German painter
Benno Kuipers (born 1974), Dutch swimmer
Benno Kusche (1916–2010), German operatic baritone
Benno Landsberger (1890–1968), German Assyriologist
Benno Larsen (born 1949), Danish footballer
Benno Leesik (1960–2006), Estonian military officer
 (fl. 1890–1920), Austrian singer
Benno Lischer (1876–1959), American orthodontist
Benno Magnusson (born 1953), Swedish footballer
Benno Martin (1893–1975), German SS functionary
Benno Mengele (1898–1971), Austrian electrical engineer
 (1928–2014), German writer
 (1912–1981), Estonian actress
Benno Möhlmann (born 1954), German footballer and manager
Benno Moiseiwitsch (1890–1963), Russian–born British pianist
 (1851–1928), German jurist
Benno Müller-Hill (1933–2018), German biologist
Benno Ndulu (1950–2021), Tanzanian banker
 (1851–1926), German industrialist
 (1932–2019), German biologist
Benno Planek (1834–1922), Moravian rabbi and writer
Benno Pludra (1925–2014), German children's author
Benno Premsela (1920–1997), Dutch artist and collector
Benno Rabinof (1902–1975), American violinist
Benno Reinhardt (1819–1852), German physician
Benno Reuter (1911–1980), German soldier and recipient of the Knight's Cross of the Iron Cross
 (1931–2014), Czech Catholic priest
Benno Saelens (born 1948), Belgian volleyball player
Benno C. Schmidt Jr. (born 1942), private school chairman
Benno C. Schmidt Sr. (1913–1999), American lawyer and venture capitalist
Benno Schmitz (born 1994), German footballer
 (1920–2006), German educator
Benno Schotz (1891–1984), Estonian–born Scottish sculptor
Benno Seppelt (1846–1931), Australian winemaker
Benno Singer (1875–1934), Hungarian–born British entertainment administrator
Benno Sternberg (1894–1962), Ukrainian Zionist
Benno Sterzenbach (1916–1985), German actor and director
Benno Straucher (1854–1940), Jewish Austro–Hungarian lawyer and politician
Benno Teschke (born 1967), German international relations theorist
Benno Frederick Toermer (1804–1859), German painter
Benno Vigny (1889–1965), French–German novelist and screenwriter
Benno Walter (1847–1901), German violinist
Benno Wandolleck (1864 – 1930), German sports shooter and zoologist
Benno Werlen (born 1952), Swiss geographer
 (1903–1987), German scholar
Benno Wiss (born 1962), Swiss cyclist
Benno Wolf (1871–1943), German judge and speleologist
Benno Ziegler (1887–1963), German operatic baritone

Surname
Alex Benno (1873–1952), Dutch actor and director
 (1777–1848), German writer
Marc Benno (born 1947), American musician
Tiina Benno (born 1961), Estonian politician

Other
Benno Stehkragen, a 1927 German silent film
Benno von Archimboldi, a fictional character in the novel 2666 by Roberto Bolaño
Benno Bikes, a bicycle manufacturer

See also
Saint Benno (disambiguation)